Jack Cogger (born 5 August 1997) is an Australian professional rugby league footballer who plays as a  and  for the Penrith Panthers in the NRL.

He previously played for the Newcastle Knights and the Canterbury Bankstown Bulldogs in the NRL and for the Huddersfield Giants in the Betfred Super League.

Background
Cogger was born in Greenacre, New South Wales, Australia. He is the son of former Western Suburbs Magpies player Trevor Cogger.

Cogger played his junior rugby league for the Toukley Hawks, before being signed by the Newcastle Knights.

Playing career

Early years
From 2014 to 2016, Cogger played for the Newcastle Knights' NYC team. In November and December 2014, he played for the Australian Schoolboys. On 21 January 2015, he re-signed with the Knights on a contract to the end of 2016. On 27 August 2015, he extended his Knights contract until the end of 2018.

2016
In 2016, Cogger captained the Knights' NYC side. In round 10 of the 2016 NRL season, he made his NRL debut for the Knights against the Cronulla-Sutherland Sharks. In July, he played for the New South Wales under-20s team against the Queensland under-20s team. He went on to play 6 NRL games in his debut season.

2017
After playing just one game for the Knights' Intrust Super Premiership NSW side, Cogger's 2017 season was derailed after having to undergo pelvis surgery. He made his return to the field in round 13 for the club's NYC side, while also playing two NRL matches at the end of the year.

2018
In January, Cogger signed a 2-year contract with the Canterbury-Bankstown Bulldogs starting in 2019, after his pathway to first-grade for the Knights was blocked through the signings of Mitchell Pearce and Connor Watson. Cogger played his final game for the Knights in his side's 12-24 loss to the St. George Illawarra Dragons in round 25.

2019
Cogger made a total of 17 appearances for Canterbury in the 2019 NRL season as the club finished 12th on the table.  At one stage, Canterbury-Bankstown found themselves sitting last on the table and in real danger of finishing with the wooden spoon.  However, for the third straight season, Canterbury achieved four upset victories in a row over Penrith, the Wests Tigers, South Sydney and Parramatta who were all competing for a place in the finals series and were higher on the table.  Pay was credited with the late season revival as the side focused heavily on defence.

2020
On 22 September, Cogger was informed by Canterbury that his services would not be required in 2021 and that he would be released at the end of the 2020 NRL season as the club looked to rebuild after a horror year on and off the field.

In December 2020, Cogger signed a contract to join Huddersfield in the Super League.

2022
On 28 May 2022, Cogger played for Huddersfield in their 2022 Challenge Cup Final loss to Wigan.

In October 2022, it was announced that Cogger had signed a one-year deal with the Penrith Panthers.

2023
On 18 February, Cogger played in Penrith's 13-12 upset loss to St Helens RFC in the 2023 World Club Challenge.

References

External links
Canterbury Bulldogs profile
Newcastle Knights profile

1997 births
Living people
Australian rugby league players
Australian expatriate sportspeople in England
Canterbury-Bankstown Bulldogs players
Huddersfield Giants players
Newcastle Knights players
Rugby league five-eighths
Rugby league halfbacks
Rugby league players from New South Wales